Io che amo solo te is a 2015 romantic comedy-drama film written and directed by Marco Ponti and starring Riccardo Scamarcio and Laura Chiatti. It debuted at the first place at the Italian box office.

Plot 

Ninella's daughter falls in love with the son of Don Mimì ...the man she always dreamed of marrying. Ninella's dream never became reality and history may repeat itself, when her daughter Chiara and Don Mimì's son Damiano find themselves involved in a whirlpool of different obstacles that may compromise their marriage as well.

Cast 

 Riccardo Scamarcio as Damiano
 Laura Chiatti as Chiara
 Michele Placido as  Don Mimì
 Maria Pia Calzone as Ninella
 Antonella Attili as  Matilde
  Michele Venitucci as  Vito
 Luciana Littizzetto as Aunt Dora
 Grazia Daddario as Mrs. Campanella
  Angela Semerano as  Nancy
 Eva Riccobono as  Daniela
  Uccio De Santis as Uccio
  Eugenio Franceschini as Orlando
 Dario Bandiera as  Pascal
  Beppe Convertini as Antonino 
 Enzo Salvi as Giancarlo Showman
 Antonio Gerardi as  Franco Torres
  Ivana Lotito as Mariangela
 Dino Abbrescia as Modesto
 Alessandra Amoroso as herself

Sequel
A sequel film entitled La cena di Natale, loosely based on the novel of the same name by Luca Bianchini, was released on 24 November 2016.

See also 
 List of Italian films of 2015

References

External links 
 

2015 comedy-drama films
Italian comedy-drama films
Films directed by Marco Ponti
2010s Italian-language films
2010s Italian films